Andrea Tagwerker (born 23 October 1970) is an Austrian luger who competed from the late 1980s to the early 1990s. Competing in four Winter Olympics, she won the bronze medal in the women's singles luge event at the 1994 Winter Olympics in Lillehammer. Tagwerker was the last non-German to win a women's single event in luge in 1997 at the Luge World Cup, Winter Olympic, World Championship, or European Championship level.

Tagwerker also won three gold medals in the mixed team event at the FIL World Luge Championships (1996, 1997, 1999) as well as silver medal in the mixed team event at the FIL World Luge Championships 1991. She won two medals in the women's singles event at the FIL European Luge Championships with a silver in 1998 and a bronze in 1996 as well as four medals in the mixed team event with two silvers in 1992 and 1996, and two bronzes in 1994 and 1998.

Tagwerker was also overall Luge World Cup champion in women's singles in 1996–7.

References
1988 luge women's singles results
1992 luge women's singles results
1994 luge women's singles results
1998 luge women's singles results

.

1970 births
Living people
Austrian female lugers
Olympic lugers of Austria
Olympic bronze medalists for Austria
Lugers at the 1988 Winter Olympics
Lugers at the 1992 Winter Olympics
Lugers at the 1994 Winter Olympics
Lugers at the 1998 Winter Olympics
Olympic medalists in luge
Medalists at the 1994 Winter Olympics
20th-century Austrian women
21st-century Austrian women